Dáithí, Daithí or Dathí, sometimes also anglicised without diacritics as Daithi or Dathi, is an Irish male given name which means swiftness or nimbleness. It is pronounced Dawh-hee. It is sometimes incorrectly used as the Irish form of David (Irish: Dáibhéad or Dáibhídh), although the two names are etymologically unrelated. It is, however, translated to David. In Icelandic it is known as Daði. 

Notable people and characters with this name include:
 Daithí Burke (born 1992), Irish hurler
 Daithí Carroll (born 1987), Irish Gaelic footballer
 Daithí Casey (born 1990), Irish Gaelic footballer
 Daithí Cooney (born 1954), Irish hurler
 Daithi De Nogla (born 1992), Irish Youtuber
 Daithí Doolan (born 1968), Irish politician
 Daithí Hand, hurling manager
 Daithí Holohan (born 1956), Irish artist
 Dáithí Lacha, main character of a homonymous Irish language television cartoon series
 Daithí McKay (born 1982), Irish politician
 Dáithí Ó Conaill (1938-1991), Irish politician
 Daithí Ó Drónaí (born 1990), Irish musician
 Daithí Ó Muirí, Irish writer
 Dáithí Ó Sé (born 1976), Irish television presenter
 Daithí Regan (born 1968), Irish hurler
 Dáithí Sproule (born 1950), Irish musician
 Nath Í mac Fiachrach, known as Dathí (d.c.445)

References

Irish-language masculine given names